Marilyn Montez Moore (June 16, 1930 – March 19, 1992) was an American jazz singer during the 1950s. She recorded one solo album, Moody Marilyn Moore (Bethlehem, 1957). Her vocal style was similar to Billie Holiday's, and according to jazz critic Will Friedwald, Holiday and Moore were friends. She was the first wife of saxophonist Al Cohn (who played on Moody Marilyn Moore) and the mother of guitarist Joe Cohn.

After Cohn and Moore separated and later divorced, Moore was left to raise her family and never recorded again.

She died in March 1992, at the age of 61.

References

External links
 
 

American jazz singers
American women jazz singers
1930 births
1992 deaths
20th-century American singers
20th-century American women singers
Bethlehem Records artists
Musicians from Chicago